The Young Botanist is a painting by Canadian artist Paul Peel. Peel began work on the painting in 1888. He continued work for two more years, completing the work in 1890. In 1987, Museum London, in London, Ontario, purchased the painting. It is still located there.

References

External links 
 Paul Peel, Historical Artist, LRAHM

1890 paintings
Canadian paintings
Paintings of children